Tirunelveli (also known as Nellai and historically (during British rule) as Tinnevelly, is a major city in the Indian state of Tamil Nadu. It is the administrative headquarters of the Tirunelveli District. It is the sixth-largest municipal corporation in the state after Chennai, Coimbatore, Madurai, Tiruchirappalli and Salem. The downtown is located on the west bank of the Thamirabarani River; its twin Palayamkottai is on the east bank. Palayamkottai is called the Oxford of South India as it has many schools and colleges. It has several important government offices.

Tirunelveli is an ancient city, recorded to be more than two millennia old. It has been ruled at different times by the Early Pandyas, the Cheras, the Medieval Cholas and Later Cholas, the later Pandyas, the Vijayanagara Empire and the British. The Polygar War, involving Palaiyakkarars led by Veerapandiya Kattabomman and forces of the British East India Company, was waged on the city's outskirts from 1797 to 1801.

Tirunelveli is administered by the Municipal Corporation, established on 1 June 1994 by the Municipal Corporation Act. The total population after the inclusion of other municipalities is 968,984. Tirunelveli is well-connected by road and rail with the rest of Tamil Nadu and India. The nearest domestic airport is Thoothukudi Airport. The nearest international airports are Madurai International Airport and Thiruvananthapuram International Airport. The nearest seaport is Thoothukudi Port.

Industries in Tirunelveli include administrative services, agricultural trading, tourism, banking, agricultural machinery, information technology and educational services. The city is an educational hub of southern India, with institutions such as Anna University Regional Campus – Tirunelveli, Tirunelveli Medical College, The Tirunelveli Veterinary College and Research Institution, Tirunelveli Law College, the Government College of Engineering, Manonmaniam Sundaranar University and much more.

Tirunelveli has a number of historical monuments, with the Nellaiappar Temple being the most prominent. The city is also renowned throughout the state for a sweet called 'Irutu kadai halwa'.

Etymology
Tirunelveli is one of the many temple towns in the state which is named after the groves, clusters or forests dominated by a particular variety of a tree or shrub and the same variety of tree or shrub sheltering the presiding deity. The region is believed to have been covered with Venu forest and hence called Venuvanam. Tirunelveli was known in Sambandar's seventh-century Saiva canonical work Tevaram as Thirunelveli. Swami Nellaiappar temple inscriptions say that Shiva (as Vrihivriteswara) descended in the form of a hedge and roof to save the paddy crop of a devotee. In Hindu legend, the place was known as Venuvana ("forest of bamboo") due to the presence of bamboo in the temple under which the deity is believed to have appeared. The early Pandyas named the city Thenpandya Nadu or Thenpandya Seemai, the Cholas Mudikonda Cholamandalam and the Nayaks Tirunelveli Seemai; it was known as Tinnelvelly by the British, and Tirunelveli after independence. The word Tirunelveli is derived from three Tamil words: thiru, nel and veli, meaning "sacred paddy hedge".

History

Tirunelveli was under the rule of Pandya kings as their secondary capital; Madurai was the empire's primary capital. The Pandya dynasty in the region dates to several centuries before the Christian era from inscriptions by Ashoka (304–232 BCE) and mention in the Mahavamsa, the Brihat-Samhita and the writings of Megasthenes (350–290 CE). The province came under the rule of Cholas under Rajendra Chola I in 1064 CE; however, it is unclear whether he conquered the region or obtained it voluntarily. Tirunelveli remained under the control of the Cholas until the early 13th century, when the second Pandyan empire was established with Madurai as its capital.

The Nellaiappar temple was the royal shrine of the later Pandyas during the 13th and 14th centuries, and the city benefited from dams constructed with royal patronage during the period. After the death of Kulasekara Pandian (1268–1308), the region was occupied by Vijayangara rulers and Marava chieftains (palayakarars, or poligars) during the 16th century. The Maravars occupied the western foothills and the Telugas, and the Kannadigas settled in the black-soil-rich eastern portion. Tirunelveli was the subsidiary capital of the Madurai Nayaks; under Viswanatha Nayak (1529–64), the city was rebuilt about 1560. Inscriptions from the Nellaiappar temple indicate the generous contributions to the temple. Nayak rule ended in 1736.

The region was captured by the subjects of the Mughal Empire such as Chanda Sahib (1740–1754) who declared himself "Nawab of Tinnevelly" as well as the Nawab of the Carnatic.
In 1743 Nizam-ul-mulk, lieutenant of the Deccan Plateau, displaced most of the Marathas from the region and Tirunelveli came under the rule of the Nawabs of Arcot. The original power lay in the hands of the polygars, who were originally military chiefs of the Nayaks. The city was known as Nellai Cheemai, with Cheemai meaning "a developed foreign town".  The polygars built forts in the hills, had 30,000 troops and waged war among themselves. In 1755, the British government sent a mission under Major Heron and Mahfuz Khan which restored some order and bestowed the city to Mahfuz Khan. The poligars waged war against Mahfuz Khan seven miles from Tirunelveli, but were defeated. The failure of Mahfuz Khan led the East India Company to send Muhammed Yusuf for help. Khan became ruler, rebelled in 1763 and was hanged in 1764. In 1758, British troops under Colonel Fullarton reduced the polygar stronghold under Veerapandiya Kattabomman. In 1797, the first Polygar war broke out between the British (under Major Bannerman) and the polygars (headed by Kattabomman). Some polygars (such as the head of Ettaiyapuram) aided the British; Kattabomman was defeated and hanged in his home province of Panchalaguruchi. Two years later, another rebellion became known as the Second Polygar War. Panchalankuruchi fell to the British, after stiff resistance. The Carnatic region came under British rule thereafter.

Tirunelveli District was formed on 1 September 1790 (Tirunelveli Day) by the East India Company (British) and named it as Tinnevelly district. The history of Tirunelveli was researched by Robert Caldwell (1814–91), a Christian missionary who visited the area. After acquiring Tirunelveli from the Nawab of Arcot in 1801, the British anglicised its name to "Tinnevelly" and made it the headquarters of Tinnelvelli District. The administrative and military headquarters was located in Palayamkottai (anglicised as "Palankottah"), from which attacks against the polygars were launched. After independence both cities reverted to their original names, and Tirunelveli remained the capital of Tirunelveli district.  In early 1900s, parts of Tirunelveli district was made as Ramanathapuram and Virudhunagar districts. In 1986, Tirunelveli district was further split into two districts for administrative purpose such as Chidambaranar (present-day Thoothukudi district) and Nellai-Kattabomman (later Tirunelveli-Kattabomman, present-day Tirunelveli districts). In 2019, Tenkasi was split from Tirunelveli District forming Tenkasi District.

Geography

It is located at the southernmost tip of the Deccan plateau. The Tamirabarani River divides the city into the Tirunelveli quarter and the Palayamkottai area. The river (with its tributaries, such as the Chittar) is the major source of irrigation, and is fed by the northeast and southwest monsoons. There are several small lakes of ponds (known as Kulam) in the city. These include Nainar Kulam, Veinthan Kulam, Elantha Kulam and Udayarpetti Kulam. The area around the Tamirabarani River and the Chittar has five streams: Kodagan, Palayan, Tirunelveli, Marudur East and Marudur West, and the Chittar feeds fifteen other channels. The soil is friable, red and sandy.

Climate
Tirunelveli has a hot semi-arid climate (Köppen: BSh) bordering on the relatively rare dry-summer tropical savanna climate (Köppen: As), scattered irregularly across the world but relatively common in areas near the Laccadive Sea.

The climate of Tirunelveli is generally hot and humid. Maximum precipitation occurs during the northeast monsoon (October–December). Since the economy of the district is primarily based on agriculture, flooding of the Tamarabarani River or a fluctuation in monsoon rain has an immediate impact on the local economy. The primary crops grown in the region are paddy and cotton. Pineapples were introduced during the 16th century, chilly and tobacco during the late 16th and potatoes during the early 17th centuries. The most common tree is the palmyra palm, a raw material in cottage industries. Other trees grown in the region are teak, wild jack, manjakadambu, venteak, vengai, pillaimaruthu, karimaruthu and bamboo. Livestock of the city and district comprises cattle, buffalo, goats, sheep and other animals in smaller numbers.

Demographics

According to 2011 census, Tirunelveli had a population of 473,637 with a sex-ratio of 1,027 females for every 1,000 males, much above the national average of 929. A total of 46,624 were under the age of six, constituting 23,894 males and 22,730 females. Scheduled Castes and Scheduled Tribes accounted for 13.17% and 0.32% of the population respectively. The average literacy of the city was 81.49%, compared to the national average of 72.99%. The city had a total of 120,466 households. There were a total of 182,471 workers, comprising 2,088 cultivators, 5,515 main agricultural labourers, 18,914 in house hold industries, 142,435 other workers, 13,519 marginal workers, 166 marginal cultivators, 913 marginal agricultural labourers, 1,828 marginal workers in household industries and 10,612 other marginal workers.

According to provisional data from the 2011 census the Tirunelveli urban agglomeration had a population of 498,984, with 246,710 males and 252,274 females. The overall sex ratio in the city was 1023, and the child sex ratio was 957. Tirunelveli had a literacy rate of 91 percent, with male literacy 95 percent and female literacy 87 percent. A total of 42,756 of the city's population was under age six.

As per the religious census of 2011, Tirunelveli had 69.0% Hindus, 20.02% Muslims, 10.59% Christians, 0.01% Sikhs, 0.01% Buddhists, 0.02% Jains and 0.35% following other religions.

The population density of the city in the 2001 census was 3,781 persons per square kilometre, compared with 2,218 persons per square kilometre in 1971. Hindus form the majority of the urban population, followed by Muslims and Christians. Tamil is the main language spoken in the city, but the use of English is relatively common; English is the medium of instruction in most educational institutions and offices in the service sector. The Tamil dialect spoken in this region is distinct, and is widely spoken throughout Tamil Nadu.

Economy
Inscriptions from the eighth to the 14th centuries (during the rule of the Pandyas, Cholas and later Tenkasi Pandyas) indicate the growth of Tirunelveli as a centre of economic growth which developed around the Nellaiappar temple. The drier parts of the province also flourished during the rule of the Vijayanagara kings. From 1550 until the early modern era, migration to the city from other parts of the state was common and the urban regions became hubs of manufacturing and commerce. Tirunelveli was a strategic point, connecting the eastern and western parts of the peninsula, as well as a trading centre. Records of sea and overland trade between 1700 and 1850 indicate close trading connections with Sri Lanka and Kerala. During the 1840s, cotton produced in the region was in demand for British mills. The chief exports during British rule were cotton, jaggery, chillies, tobacco, palmyra fibre, salt, dried saltwater fish and cattle.

Occupations in Tirunelveli include service-sector activities such as administration, agricultural trading, tourism, banking, agro-machinery, cement manufacturing, information technology and educational services. In 1991, the Tirunelveli region ranked second in the number of women workers. Service sectors such as tourism have developed, due to a growth in religious tourism. Tirunelveli has beedi and cement factories, tobacco companies, workshops for steel-based products and mills for cotton textiles, spinning and weaving; there are also small-scale industries, such as tanneries and brick kilns. The agricultural areas, hand-woven clothes and household industries contribute to the economic growth of the city. Food-processing industries have developed since the late 1990s; at the district level, it is the foremost industrial segment. Industries involving rice-making, blue-jelly metal manufacturing and jem power generating are located on the outskirts of the city. The major agricultural produces in the region are paddy and cotton. Beedi production during the 1990s earned an annual revenue of  190 billion and a foreign exchange of  8 billion across the three districts of Tirunelveli, Tiruchirapalli and Vellore.

Tirunelveli is a major area for wind-power generation. Most wind-power-generation units in Tamil Nadu are located in Tirunelveli and Kanyakumari Districts. In 2005 they contributed 2036.9 MW to the state power-generation capacity. Many private, multinational wind companies are located on the outskirts of the city. In June 2007 the Tata Group signed a memorandum of understanding with the state government to open a titanium dioxide plant, with an estimated value of  25 billion, in Tirunelveli District and Thoothukudi District. However, the state government put the project on hold after increasing protests against it.

Administration and politics

The Tirunelveli Municipality was established in 1866 during British rule. It became a City Municipal Corporation in 1994, bringing the Palayamkottai and Melapalayam municipalities, the Thatchanallur town panchayat and eleven other village panchayats within the city limits. The municipal corporation has five zones: Tirunelveli, Thatchanallur, Palayamkottai, Pettai and Melapalayam. The corporation has 55 wards, with an elected councillor for each ward. The corporation has six departments: general administration and personnel, engineering, revenue, public health, city planning and information technology (IT). All departments are under the control of a municipal commissioner. Legislative power is vested in a body of 55 members, one from each ward. The legislative body is headed by an elected chairperson, assisted by a deputy. Tirunelveli city is the district headquarters for the Tirunelveli district.
The city is part of the Tirunelveli assembly constituency, electing a member to the Tamil Nadu Legislative Assembly every five years. Since the 1977 elections, the assembly seat was held by the Dravida Munnetra Kazhagam (DMK) for three terms (following the 1989, 1996 and 2006 elections) and the All India Anna Dravid Munnetra Kazhagam (AIADMK) for six terms following the 1977, 1980, 1984, 1991, 2001 and 2011 elections. The current MLA is Nainar Nagendran, ex-minister, and legislative party leader of BJP

Tirunelveli is a part of the Tirunelveli Lok Sabha constituency, which contains six assembly constituencies: Tirunelveli, Nanguneri, Ambasamudram, Alangulam, Radhapuram and Palayamkottai. The current Member of Parliament from the constituency is S. Gnanathiraviam of the DMK. Since 1957, the Tirunelveli parliament seat was held by the Indian National Congress for four terms: 1957–1961, 1962–67, 2004–09 and 2009–14. The Swantantra Party and the CPI won once each, from 1967 to 1971 and 1971–77 respectively. The DMK won the seat twice: 1980–84 and 1996–98. The ADMK won the seat seven times: 1977–80, 1984–89, 1989–91, 1991–96, 1998, 1999–2004 and 2014 elections.

Law and Order of the city is maintained by the Tirunelveli City division of the Tamil Nadu Police, headed by a commissioner. There are units for prohibition enforcement, district crime, social justice and human rights, district crime records and a special branch operating at the district level, each headed by a deputy superintendent of police.

Transport

Tirunelveli has an extensive transport network and is well-connected to other major cities by road, rail and air. Twenty-two kilometres (fourteen miles) of highway are maintained by the State Highways Department and thirty kilometres (nineteen miles) by the National Highways Department. In 1844, a bridge was built by Colonel Horsley across the Tamirabarani River, connecting Tirunelveli to Palayamkottai. NH 138 connects Palayamkottai with Tuticorin Port. Tirunelveli is also connected by major highways to Kollam, Tiruchendur, Rajapalayam, Sankarankovil, Ambasamudram and Nazareth.

The main bus stand (popularly known as the New Bus Stand), opened in 2003, is located in Veinthaankulam and there is regular bus service to and from the city.  The main bus stand has been developed under the Smart City Projects at a total cost of Rs. 50.72 crores (500.72 million).  Renamed as the Bharat Ratna Dr. MGR Bus Stand, it was inaugurated by Chief Minister M.K. Stalin on 8 December 2021 through video conferencing. The other bus stands (for intracity services) are the Junction and Palay bus stands. The Tamil Nadu State Transport Corporation has daily services to a number of cities, and the corporation operates a computerised reservation centre in the main bus stand. It also operates local buses serving the city and neighbouring villages. The Periyar bus stand commonly known as the old bus stand is fully demolished and a new bus station will be built under smart city plan. The State Express Transport Corporation has intercity services to Bangalore, Chennai, Kanyakumari, Trivandrum and other cities.

Tirunelveli Junction railway station is one of the oldest railway stations in India. The line from Tirunelveli to Sengottai was opened in 1903; the connection to Quilon, which was completed later, was the most important trade route to Travancore province in British India. The city is connected to major cities in all four directions: Madurai and Sankarankovil to the north, Nagercoil and Trivandrum to the south, Sengottai and Kollam to the west and Tiruchendur to the east. Tirunelveli is also connected to major Indian cities with daily services to Chennai, Coimbatore, Tiruchirappalli, Madurai, Kanyakumari, Salem, Tirupati, Hosur, Bangalore, Hyderabad, Mangalore, Ernakulam, Trivandrum, Mumbai, Guruvayur, Kolkata, Jabalpur, Varanasi, Delhi, Jammu, Kollam, Palghat and Ahmedabad. There are daily passenger services to Tuticorin, Madurai, Tiruchendur, Tiruchirapalli, Coimbatore, Mayiladuthurai, Nagercoil, Palghat and Kollam.

Culture

Nellaiappar Temple is a Hindu temple dedicated to Shiva in the form of Nellaiappar. The deity is revered in the verses of Tevaram, a seventh-century Saiva work by Sambandar. The temple was greatly expanded during the 16th-century Nayak period and has a number of architectural attractions, including musical pillars. The temple has several festivals, the foremost an annual festival when the temple chariot is brought around the streets near the temple. It is one of the Pancha Sabhai temples, the five royal courts of Nataraja (the dancing form of Shiva), where he performed a cosmic dance. The Nataraja shrine in the temple represents copper, and features many copper sculptures. Tirunelveli has its fair share of temples, dating back to ancient times. It also prides itself as being the site where the Nellaiappar Temple is located

Tirunelveli is also known for halwa, a sweet made of wheat, sugar and ghee. It originated during the mid-1800s at Lakshmi Vilas Stores, which still exist. The art of sweet-making spread to other parts of Tamil Nadu, such as Nagercoil, Srivilliputhur and Thoothukudi. Tirunelveli halwa was popularised by Iruttukadai Halwa, a shop opened in 1900 which sells the sweets only during twilight.

Tirunelveli has a number of cinemas which predominantly play Tamil movies. It is among the 40 cities in India with FM radio stations. Tirunelveli's stations are Tirunelveli Vanoli Nilayam (All India Radio, from the Government of India), Suryan FM (operated by Sun Network on 93.5 MHz) and Hello FM (operated by the Malai Malar Group on 106.4 MHz).

A number of state- and national-level sports events are sponsored in Tirunelveli annually. The VOC grounds (in central Palayamkottai) and the Anna Stadium (on St. Thomas Road) are popular venues in the city, and some events are held at scholastic sports facilities. As in India generally, the most popular sport is cricket. Also popular are football, volleyball, swimming and hockey, played on facilities provided by the Tirunelveli Division of the Sports Development Authority of Tamil Nadu.

The Government Exhibition, an annual event at Exhibition Grounds, attracts thousands of visitors from in and around Tirunelveli. the District Science Center - Tirunelveli is in the centre of the city. Near the city are regional tourist attractions such as the Manimuthar and Papanasam Dams, the Ariakulam and Koonthakulam Bird Sanctuaries, Manjolai and Upper Kodaiyar.

Education

During the 1790s, Tamil Christians established a number of schools in Tirunelveli. The missionary educational system included primary and boarding schools, seminaries, industrial schools, orphanages and colleges. The first boarding school for girls was opened in 1821, but its efforts were hampered by the emphasis on Christian education. Thomas Munro (1761–1827) of the British East India Company established a two-tier school system: district schools, teaching law, and sub-district schools teaching vernacular languages in the Madras Presidency. Tirunelveli had four sub-district schools: two teaching Tamil and one each for Telugu and Persian.

Tirunelveli city has 80 schools: 29 higher secondary schools, 12 high schools, 22 middle schools and 17 primary schools; the city corporation operates 33 of these schools. The city has eight arts and science colleges and six professional colleges. The Manonmaniam Sundaranar University is named for poet Manonmaniam Sundaranar, who wrote "Tamil Thai Vazhthu" the state anthem. Most Christian schools and colleges in the city are located in the Palayamkottai area.

Anna University of Technology Tirunelveli was established in 2007, offering a variety of engineering and technology courses for undergraduate and graduate students. Tirunelveli Medical College, Veterinary College and Research Institution, Government Law College, Tirunelveli  and the Government College of Engineering, Tirunelveli are professional colleges operated by the government of Tamil Nadu. Sarah Tucker College was the first college for women in south India.

The Indian Institute of Geomagnetism (IIG) operates a regional unit, the Equatorial Geophysical Research Laboratory, conducting research in geomagnetism and atmospheric and space sciences. The city has a District Science Centre (a satellite unit of Visvesvaraya Industrial and Technological Museum, Bangalore) with permanent exhibitions, science shows, interactive self-guided tours, a mini-planetarium and sky observation.

Tirunelveli and the district have a high rate of child labour. The drop in female school attendance between ages 15 and 19 is almost four times greater than that in the rest of Tamil Nadu.

Utilities
Electric service to Tirunelveli is regulated and distributed by the Tamil Nadu Electricity Board (TNEB). The city is headquarters for the Tirunelveli region of the four-division TNEB and, with its suburbs, forms the Tirunelveli Electricity Distribution Circle. A chief distribution engineer is stationed at regional headquarters. Water supply is provided by the Tirunelveli City Corporation from the Tamirabarani River, throughout the city.

About 100 metric tonnes of solid waste are collected from the city daily in door-to-door collection; source segregation and disposal is performed by the sanitary department of the Tirunelveli Municipal Corporation. The underground drainage system was constituted in 1998, covering 22 percent of the corporation area. The remaining system for disposal of sewage is through septic tanks and public conveniences. The clinics operated by the corporation provide primary health care to the urban poor through family-welfare and immunisation programs. In addition, there are private hospitals and clinics providing health care to citizens.

Tirunelveli is part of the Tirunelveli Telecom District of Bharat Sanchar Nigam Limited (BSNL), India's state-owned telecom and internet-services provider. Both Global System for Mobile Communications (GSM) and Code division multiple access (CDMA) mobile services are available. In addition to telecommunications, BSNL also provides broadband internet service. Tirunelveli is one of a few cities in India where BSNL's Caller Line Identification (CLI)-based internet service, Netone, is available. The city has a Passport Seva Kendra, a public-private-sector collaboration, which accepts passport applications from the Tirunelveli region for the passport office in Madurai.

Notes

References

 
 .
 
 
 
 
 
 
 
 
 
 
 .
 
 
 
 
 
 
 
 
 .
 .
 .

External links

 Tirunelveli City-Municipal Corporation

 
Cities and towns in Tirunelveli district